Althea Gibson defeated Darlene Hard in the final, 6–3, 6–2 to win the ladies' singles tennis title at the 1957 Wimbledon Championships. Gibson was the first African American player to win a singles title at Wimbledon. Shirley Fry was the defending champion, but did not compete.

Seeds

  Althea Gibson (champion)
  Louise Brough (quarterfinals)
  Shirley Bloomer (fourth round)
  Dorothy Knode (semifinals)
  Darlene Hard (final)
  Thelma Long (first round)
  Angela Mortimer (third round)
  Věra Pužejová (third round)

Draw

Finals

Top half

Section 1

Section 2

Section 3

Section 4

Bottom half

Section 5

Section 6

Section 7

Section 8

References

External links

Women's Singles
Wimbledon Championship by year – Women's singles
Wimbledon Championships
Wimbledon Championships